Still Dreaming is a studio album by American jazz musician Joshua Redman. The album was recorded with Ron Miles on cornet, Scott Colley on bass, and Brian Blade on drums, and released on 25 May 2018 via Nonesuch label. The album is inspired by Joshua Redman's father Dewey Redman's 1976–1987 band, Old and New Dreams. The record consists of eight compositions, six of which are originals written by band members.

Reception 
Rob Adams of The Herald stated "The approach is free-spirited but with each player bringing logic, shape, hunger and direction to a style drawing on folk, blues and gospel influences". Geanine Reid of All About Jazz wrote "Redman's latest exploration is a delight. One of the most accomplished and versatile players on the saxophone scene, his attention to melody and exquisite soloing abilities through salient motivic saturation is breathtaking".

John Fordham of The Guardian mentioned "This is a supergroup at work, but – as with Coleman’s own bands and Old and New Dreams themselves – they never sound as if they’re trying to make an issue out of that". Matt Collar of AllMusic added "On his buoyant 2018 album Still Dreaming, Joshua Redman evokes the spirit of his late father, saxophonist Dewey Redman (who died in 2006), and the elder Redman's adventurous work with longtime friend and bandleader Ornette Coleman".

Walter Tunis of Lexington Herald-Leader stated "It all makes for a jazz adventure that begs for repeated listening. The more you tune in, the more you hear the present day curators of a sublime jazz legacy forging its music into something unmistakably new".

Rolling Stone included the release in its 20 Best Jazz Albums of 2018 list, ranking it #20.

Track listing

Personnel 
Musicians
 Joshua Redman – liner notes,  producer, sax (tenor)
 Brian Blade – drums
 Scott Colley – bass
 Ron Miles – cornet

Production
 Robert Hurwitz – executive producer
 James Farber– associate producer, engineer
 Greg Calbi – engineer (mastering)
 Owen Mulholland – assistant engineer

 John Gall – design
 Hans Jörgen Johansen – cover photo
 Jon Brown – band photo

References 

Joshua Redman albums
Nonesuch Records albums
2018 albums